Acacia dimorpha is a shrub belonging to the genus Acacia and the subgenus Lycopodiifoliae. It is native to an area in the Kimberley region of Western Australia.

See also
List of Acacia species

References

dimorpha
Acacias of Western Australia
Taxa named by Russell Lindsay Barrett
Taxa named by Bruce Maslin
Taxa named by Matthew David Barrett